Franz Torres (born July 25, 1981, in Mexico City) is a former Mexican professional footballer who last played for Celaya on loan from UNAM of Liga MX.

External links

Liga MX players
Living people
Footballers from Mexico City
1981 births
Mexican footballers
Association football defenders
Club Celaya footballers
Lobos BUAP footballers
Atlante F.C. footballers
C.D. Veracruz footballers
Altamira F.C. players
Chiapas F.C. footballers
Atlético Morelia players
Club Universidad Nacional footballers